Paulownia fortunei commonly called the dragontree, dragon tree or Fortune's empress tree, is a deciduous tree in the family Paulowniaceae, native to southeastern China (including Taiwan), Laos and Vietnam. It is an extremely fast-growing tree, due to its use of C carbon fixation, and is planted for timber harvesting. It appears to be nowhere near as dangerously invasive as Paulownia tomentosa.

Uses
Aside from its use as a cheap timber tree, it is being studied for use in phytoremediation and carbon sequestration. P. fortunei is cultivated as an ornamental tree in parks and gardens. Its cultivar ='Minfast' has gained the Royal Horticultural Society's Award of Garden Merit.

References

Paulowniaceae
Trees of China
Trees of Laos
Trees of Taiwan
Trees of Vietnam
Plants described in 1890